Reklaw is a city in Cherokee and Rusk counties in the U.S. state of Texas. The population was 379 at the 2010 census.

History
The town is named for Margaret Walker, who donated the land for the townsite, but since a Walker, Texas already existed elsewhere, the town simply spelled her name backwards.  Similarly, the nearby town of Sacul was also named with a spelling reversal.

Geography

Reklaw is located at  (31.861944, –94.984965).

According to the United States Census Bureau, the city has a total area of 2.9 square miles (7.6 km), all of it land. Most of the city lies in Cherokee County, with only a small portion extending into Rusk County.

Climate

The climate in this area is characterized by hot, humid summers and generally mild to cool winters.  According to the Köppen Climate Classification system, Reklaw has a humid subtropical climate, abbreviated "Cfa" on climate maps.

Demographics

As of the census of 2000, there were 327 people, 130 households, and 88 families residing in the city. The population density was 111.3 people per square mile (42.9/km). There were 150 housing units at an average density of 51.1 per square mile (19.7/km). The racial makeup of the city was 85.02% White, 7.65% African American, 0.31% Native American, 5.20% from other races, and 1.83% from two or more races. Hispanic or Latino of any race were 13.46% of the population.

There were 130 households, out of which 24.6% had children under the age of 18 living with them, 59.2% were married couples living together, 6.2% had a female householder with no husband present, and 32.3% were non-families. 28.5% of all households were made up of individuals, and 19.2% had someone living alone who was 65 years of age or older. The average household size was 2.52 and the average family size was 3.18.

In the city, the population was spread out, with 20.8% under the age of 18, 8.9% from 18 to 24, 24.2% from 25 to 44, 25.1% from 45 to 64, and 21.1% who were 65 years of age or older. The median age was 41 years. For every 100 females, there were 94.6 males. For every 100 females age 18 and over, there were 97.7 males.

The median income for a household in the city was $29,167, and the median income for a family was $38,250. Males had a median income of $27,083 versus $18,750 for females. The per capita income for the city was $16,092. About 6.5% of families and 16.1% of the population were below the poverty line, including 25.0% of those under age 18 and 17.5% of those age 65 or over.

Education
The City of Reklaw is served by the Rusk Independent School District.

Postal service

The United States Postal Service operates a post office in Reklaw to serve the residents of the city and the outlying areas.

See also
 List of geographic names derived from anagrams and ananyms

References

Cities in Cherokee County, Texas
Cities in Rusk County, Texas
Cities in Texas
Longview metropolitan area, Texas